Till I Met You is a 2006 romantic film from the Philippines, starring the romantic pairing of Regine Velasquez and Robin Padilla with a very special part by Eddie Garcia. Also appearing are Mike "Pekto" Nacua, Joonee Gamboa, Luz Valdez, Idda Yaneza and, in another special part, Kuh Ledesma, who originally sung the soundtrack. The cast also includes StarStruck's ultimate survivors Jackie Rice and the late Marky Cielo. The film was directed by Mark A. Reyes and produced by GMA Pictures and Viva Films.

This is the first film co-produced by GMA Films & VIVA Films years after VIVA withdrew from GMA. The joint production between VIVA & GMA is still a major factor after their split-up in 2000 and 2004.

Synopsis
Señor Manuel (Eddie Garcia) is an elderly gentleman who falls in love with the charming Luisa (Regine Velasquez), a confident trickster posing as a rich socialite. In preparation for their upcoming wedding, Señor Manuel takes Luisa back to see his hacienda and introduces his new fiancée to the staff. Among which is Gabriel (Robin Padilla), Manuel's right-hand man, who is not only well respected by the town's people, but is also the one person that Señor Manuel trusts the most. Likewise, Gabriel cares deeply for the old man and is very protective of the haciendero; so much so that during the initial meeting, the fiercely devoted Gabriel immediately becomes suspicious that Luisa is a fake and is only after Señor Manuel's money. In order to expose Luisa as nothing but a gold digger,  Caught in a tangled web of lies and deceit, all so unexpected . . .all so unwanted, what twisted fate awaits them?

Trivia
This was the first film from the alliance of Viva and GMA after their split up in 2000 and 2004.

See also
VIVA Films
GMA Films
She's Dating the Gangster

References

External links
Official Website

GMA Pictures films
Viva Films films
2006 films
2000s Tagalog-language films
Philippine romance films
Films directed by Mark A. Reyes